Home Alone: Original Motion Picture Soundtrack is the soundtrack of the 1990 film of the same name. The score was composed by John Williams and nominated for the Academy Award for Best Original Score; the film's signature tune "Somewhere in My Memory" was nominated for the Academy Award for Best Original Song and the Grammy Award for Best Song Written for Visual Media.

"Somewhere in My Memory" was written to "run alongside the film" by Williams. It can be heard in numerous sections of the film, either in full length or fragments, forming the backbone for the film's soundtrack. "Somewhere in My Memory" is performed in many Christmas concerts in schools or professional orchestras and choirs alike across the globe. A version in Spanish was recorded in Spain for the ending credits of Home Alone 2: Lost in New York. This version was performed by singer Ana Belén and is entitled "Sombras de otros tiempos" ("Shadows of Other/Former Times"). Making the Plane is inspired by Trepak by Tchaikovsky.

Track listing 
All tracks written and conducted by John Williams except where noted.

Charts

Expanded score

Track listing
 "Somewhere in My Memory" – 3:24
 "Star of Bethlehem" (orchestral version) – 2:54
 "Theme from Home Alone" – 1:27
 "Go Pack Your Suitcase/Introducing Marley/In Good Hands" – 1:51
 "Banished to the Attic" – 1:07
 "We Slept In/Hand Count" – 1:20
 "Making the Plane" – 0:54
 "The Basement" – 2:18
 "Target Practice/Sledding on the Stairs" – 1:31
 "Lights On/Guess Who's Home/Paris Arrival" – 3:18

Awards

References

External links

1990s film soundtrack albums
1990 soundtrack albums
CBS Records soundtracks
Home Alone (franchise)
John Williams soundtracks